Glycine canescens, called the silky glycine, is a species of soybean native to Australia. A perennial living across the Outback in extremely hot and dry conditions, it is being studied for its potential to improve the cultivated soybean (Glycine max).

References

canescens
Endemic flora of Australia
Plants described in 1962